Dalupiri Island is an island in the Babuyan Islands in Luzon Strait north of Luzon Island in the Philippines. The whole island makes up the barangay of Dalupiri, which is part of the municipality of Calayan in Cagayan province, which had 621 inhabitants in 2020, up from 611 in 2010.

The island can reached by boat from the Port of Aparri.

Geography
The longest river of the island is the Manolong River, about 2.5 km long. 

The vegetation of the island consists partly of dense, tropical vegetation, and partly agricultural land. The largest animals on the island are the Carabao and horses. A small population of the Philippine crocodile (Crocodylus mindorensis) is also native to the island. Of the avifauna (birds) present on the island,  the nankeen night heron (Nycticorax caledonicus) and the Zebra Ralle (Gallirallus torquatus) both are known to breed on the island. 

Another island named Dalupiri is located in the Samar Sea, in the province of Northern Samar.

References
This article contains Public domain text from the U.S. Government Elihu Root collection of United States documents relating to the Philippine Islands (1906)

Babuyan Islands
Islands of Cagayan
Barangays of Cagayan